Aslı Enver Gökbudak (born 10 May 1984) is a Turkish actress. She is best known for her roles in several TV series including as Mine in Kavak Yelleri, as Ahu Kumral in Suskunlar and as Süreyya in İstanbullu Gelin. She is also known for her roles in Kayıp, Bana Artık Hicran De, Kardeşim Benim, Tamam mıyız? and Babil.

Biography
Enver was born on 10 May 1984, in London, England, and lived there until she was 12 years old. Her father is a Turkish Cypriot who grew up in London and met and married Enver's mother there, while she was abroad for her studies. As a teenager, Aslı Enver won a song contest in London. She started theatre at Mujdat Gezen Art Centre in Istanbul. She studied at Pera Fine Arts High School and graduated in theatre studies from Haliç University. She had her first minor-guest role in Uzay Sitcomu. Later, she had a part in the hit young series Hayat Bilgisi and played the main character "Mine Ergun" in the popular youth series Kavak Yelleri (a remake of Dawson's Creek) for five seasons. She has acted in the movies Tamam mıyız? and Kardeşim Benim and starred in the TV series Suskunlar, Kayıp, Bana Artık Hicran De, Mutlu Ol Yeter and Kış Güneşi.

Personal life 
On 13 July 2012, Enver married Birkan Sokullu. On 27 August 2015, they made a statement through their lawyers and announced their divorce.

In 2015, she became close to her Kardeşim Benim costar, Murat Boz, with whom she started a relationship in 2016. The couple broke up in May 2017. After a few months of reconciliation, they eventually ended their relationship in April 2018. In November 2018, they announced their reconciliation after 8 months of separation. However, they broke up again in October 2019.

On 12 November 2022, Enver married businessman Berkin Gökbudak.

Dolunay Soysert and Nilay Sorgüven are among her close friends.

In May 2020, she confirmed that she had been diagnosed with dyslexia at a young age.

Filmography

Awards and nominations

References

Araba Nasıl Korunur?

External links
 

1984 births
Living people
Actresses from London
21st-century Turkish actresses
Turkish film actresses
Turkish television actresses
Turkish stage actresses
British people of Turkish Cypriot descent
British people of Turkish descent
Golden Butterfly Award winners
Actors with dyslexia
21st-century English women
21st-century English people